The Mooney TX-1 or Mooney MT-20 was a prototype American military basic training aircraft of the 1980s.  It was a two-seat derivative of Mooney's popular M20 light aircraft, but was unsuccessful, only a single example being built.

Design and development
In late 1982 the Mooney Aircraft Company of Kerrville, Texas flew a prototype of a two-seat military trainer aircraft, the Mooney TX-1. This was based on its popular Mooney M20K four seat light aircraft, but with side-by-side seating for pilot and instructor under a sliding canopy.  It was an all-metal low-winged monoplane with retractable tricycle landing gear powered by a single Continental O-360 piston engine driving a two-blade propeller. The TX-1 was aimed at the basic trainer market, also being suitable for weapons training and light attack missions, and so was fitted with four hardpoints under the wing.

Mooney stated that they needed orders for 100 aircraft to launch production of the TX-1, but these did not occur, and no production followed. The prototype's aircraft registration was cancelled in 1989.

Specifications

See also

Notes

References

"Airdata File: Mooney TX-1". Air International, August 1983, Vol 25 No 2. ISSN 0306-5634. pp. 100–101. 
 Beavis, Simon. "Military Aircraft of the World". Flight International, 3 August 1985, pp. 29–83.

1980s United States military trainer aircraft
TX-1